Hassan bin Abdullah Sunny (born 2 April 1984) is a Singaporean professional footballer who plays as a goalkeeper for the Singapore Premier League club Albirex Niigata (S) and the Singapore national team. He is regarded as one of the greatest goalkeeper’s in Singapore’s history and listed as one of the top goalkeepers in the world.

Football career

Club career 
Along with Baihakki Khaizan, Shahril Ishak and Khairul Amri, Hassan was in the pioneer batch of the National Football Academy in 2000.

Hassan has previously played for S.League clubs Tampines Rovers, Geylang United and Young Lions.

According to the interview he granted in November 2007, Hassan only started playing football competitively when he was 10, captaining his school, May Primary School. He later went on to represent Braddell Secondary School football team as well.

Hassan started out in football as a midfielder, only switching to between the sticks due to an asthma attack he suffered when he was 12. He also quipped that his happiest football memory was that, back in 1999, he scored the winning goal from the halfway line in a game that ended 2-1.

Hassan joined the Eagles from the Singapore U-18 team and quickly cemented his spot in the first team, earning an S.League Young Player of the Year nomination for his confident performances and knack for pulling off blinding saves.

Singapore Armed Forces 
In December 2011, Hassan joined SAFFC, after four years of service as Tampines Rovers' first-choice goalkeeper.

His brilliant performances in the 2014 S.League season helped the Warriors win the S.League title. He also became the first goalkeeper to win the S.League Player of the Year award in 2014.

Army United 
Hassan joined Army United F.C. for the 2015 Thai Premier League season. He made his debut in a 1-0 win over Royal Thai Navy F.C. After a series of games in good form Hassan excelled in a surprising 1-0 away win at Suphanburi F.C., handing the latter side their first home defeat of the 2015 season as well as giving Hassan man-of-the-match award. After the game Suphanburi player Jakkaphan Pornsai said Hassan's performance was the main reason Suphanburi lost the match. In November 2015 Hassan signed a new two-year contract with the club. In December 2016 after the relegation of Army United from Thai League 1, Hassan Sunny was released from the team, ending two years of service at the Thai club.

Home United 
Following his release from the Thai League side, Hassan signed for S.League side Home United FC.

Return to Army United 
After the end of 2017 S.League season, Hassan re-signed for Army United and will play for them in the 2018 Thai League 2 season. He made his second debut for the club in the club's season opener against Nongbua Pitchaya on 10 February 2018, facing off against another Singaporean goalkeeper, Izwan Mahbud, who was also making his debut.

Return to Home United 
After 2 seasons with Army United, Hassan penned a two-year deal with his former club, Home United.

During a match against Balestier Khalsa on August 8, 2021, Hassan was substituted after suffering an injury from a collision with teammate Jorge Felipe. The collision ultimately led to Šime Žužul opening the score for the Jaguars though the Sailors were able to salvage a point through Plazibat.

International career 
A graduate of the National Football Academy, Hassan forced his way into Singapore against India after a superb debut season with Geylang United in 2003.

With midfielder Shahril Ishak, defender Baihakki Khaizan and winger Muhammad Ridhuan, he is part of the 'NFA Gang of Four', the quartet which has played together since their early teenage years and earned senior international honors in 2003.

He kept goal for the U-23 team that participated in the 2003 South-East Asian Games in Vietnam, before joining the Young Lions for the 2004 S.League season.

His first appearance in a Lions shirt came in August 2003 when the young keeper replaced Rezal Hassan at half-time in a friendly against the Japan Olympic team.

He had to wait until 18 February 2004 for his first cap for Singapore though, which came against India in a World Cup qualifier.

He has been a regular fixture in the national team, though only as a substitute for Lionel Lewis. However, due to his poor performances in the Merdeka Cup in 2007 with the Under-23 team, he was dropped for the friendly against UAE and Jasper Chan was called up in his place.

His fine display at the 2007 SEA Games helped the Singapore Under-23 squad win the bronze medal - their first SEA Games medal since 1995.

He performed extremely well in a World Cup Qualifier match against Saudi Arabia, but Singapore lost the match 2-0.

On 28 July 2008, Hassan played the first half as part of a Singapore Selection side in a friendly match against the Brazil Olympics Team and made outstanding saves against Diego and Alexandre Pato shots, letting in only three goals.

In 2016, UK based The Telegraph ranked him #18 on its list of the world's top 20 goalkeepers. He admitted to the Straits Times that he originally thought that it was a late April Fools joke.

Hassan won his 75th cap for the Lions in early September 2018 against Mauritius.

Hassan was selected for the 2020 AFF Suzuki Cup that took place in December 2021, featuring in all of Singapore's games and making 20 saves. On 25 December 2021, Hassan made 11 saves for the Lions against Indonesia but got sent off in the 118th minute of extra time after a last man tackle of Irfan Jaya. The Lions lost 4-2 in the end but Hassan received applause from both home and away fans for his heroic duties.

Others

Singapore Selection Squad 
Hassan was selected as part of the Singapore Selection squad for The Sultan of Selangor’s Cup held on 6 May 2017.

Outside football 
In October, Hassan with his family opened a Nasi Padang stall, Dapur Hassan, in Tampines, Singapore.

Career statistics

Club
. Caps and goals may not be correct.

 Young Lions is ineligible for qualification to AFC competitions in their respective leagues.

Honours

International
Singapore
 AFF Championship: 2004, 2007
 Southeast Asian Games: Bronze Medal - 2007

Clubs
Warriors FC
S-League : 2014

Lion City Sailors
Singapore Premier League : 2021

Individual
 S.League Player of the Year: 2014

References

External links
 
 
 Player profile - doha-2006.com

1984 births
Living people
Singapore international footballers
Singaporean footballers
Geylang International FC players
Tampines Rovers FC players
Warriors FC players
Singapore Premier League players
Hassan Sunny
Expatriate footballers in Thailand
Hassan Sunny
Association football goalkeepers
Footballers at the 2006 Asian Games
Footballers at the 2014 Asian Games
Southeast Asian Games bronze medalists for Singapore
Southeast Asian Games medalists in football
Competitors at the 2007 Southeast Asian Games
Asian Games competitors for Singapore
Lion City Sailors FC players
FIFA Century Club